Diadegma crassiseta is a wasp first described by C.G. Thomson in 1887.
No subspecies are listed.

References 

crassiseta
Insects described in 1887